A gas holder or gasholder, also known as a gasometer, is a large container in which natural gas or town gas is stored near atmospheric pressure at ambient temperatures. The volume of the container follows the quantity of stored gas, with pressure coming from the weight of a movable cap.

Gas holders now tend to be used for balancing purposes to ensure that gas pipes can be operated within a safe range of pressures, rather than for actually storing gas for later use.

Etymology 
Antoine Lavoisier devised the first gas holder, which he called a gazomètre, to assist his work in pneumatic chemistry. It enabled him to weigh the gas in a pneumatic trough with the precision he required. He published his Traité Élémentaire de Chimie in 1789. James Watt Junior collaborated with Thomas Beddoes in constructing the pneumatic apparatus, a shortlived piece of medical equipment that incorporated a gazomètre. Watt then adapted the gazomètre for coal gas storage.

The anglicisation "gasometer" was adopted by William Murdoch, the inventor of gas lighting, in 1782, as the name for his gas holders. Murdoch's associates objected that his "gasometer" was not a meter but a container, but the name was retained and came into general use. Gas holders were marked as gasometers on the large-scale maps issued by the British Ordnance Survey and term came to be used to label gas works, even though there may be several gas holders at any one gas works. However, the term "gasometer" is still discouraged for use in technical circles, where "gas holder" is preferred.

The spelling "gas holder" is used by the BBC, among other institutions, but the variant "gasholder" is more commonly used.

History 

Before the mid-20th century coal gas was produced in retorts by heating coal in the absence of air, the process being known as coal gasification. Coal gas was first used for municipal lighting, the gas being passed through wooden or metal pipes from the retort to the lantern. The first public piped gas supply was to thirteen gas lamps installed along the length of Pall Mall, London, in 1807. The credit for this installation goes to the German inventor and entrepreneur Frederick Albert Winsor. Digging up streets to lay pipes required easements, and this delayed both further installation of street lighting, and the installation of gas for domestic illumination, heating and cooking.

Many people experimented with coal distillation to produce a flammable gas, including Jean Tardin (1618), Clayton (1684) Jean-Pierre Minckelers, Leuven (1785) and Pickel (D)(1786). William Murdoch was successful. He joined Boulton and Watt, at the Soho manufactory in Birmingham in 1777, and in 1792 he built a retort to heat coal to produce the gas that illuminated his home and office in Redruth. His system lacked a storage method until James Watt Junior adapted a Lavoisier gazomètre for this purpose. A gasometer was incorporated into the first small gasworks built for the Soho manufactory in 1798.

William Murdoch and his pupil Samuel Clegg went on to install retorts in individual factories and other workplaces. The earliest was in 1805, at Lee & Phillips, Salford Twist Mill, where eight gas holders were installed. This was shortly followed by one in Sowerby Bridge, constructed by Clegg for Henry Lodge.

The first independent commercial gas works were built by the Gas Light and Coke Company in Great Peter Street, Westminster, in 1812, with wooden pipes laid to gas lights on Westminster Bridge on New Year's Eve in 1813. Public gas lights were seen as a means to reduce crime and until the 1840s they were regulated by police authorities.

In fact any small leak from an enclosed gas holder created a potentially explosive build-up of air and gas within the enclosing house, presenting a far greater danger than the original leak did; putting houses around gas holders was discontinued in the UK. In the United States, however, where gas needed to be protected from much more extreme weather, gasometer houses continued to be built and were architecturally decorative.

The telescopic gas holder was first invented in 1824. The cup and dip (grip) seal was patented by Hutchinson in 1833, and the first working example was built in Leeds. Gas holders were then built all around the UK in great numbers starting in the 1850s. The first were the two-lift column-supported type; later they could have four lifts, being frame-guided, and they could be retrofitted with an additional flying lift. The large gas holders at Kings Cross, London, were built in the 1860s.

William Gadd of Gadd & Mason in Manchester invented the spirally guided gas holder in 1890. Instead of external columns or guide frames, his design operated with spiral rails. The first commercial design was built in Northwich, Cheshire, in the same year. By the end of the 19th century most towns in Britain had their own gas works and gas holders.

Municipal gas works became superfluous in the later 20th century, but gas holders and production plant were still in use in steel works in 2016.

Function 

A gas holder provided storage for purified, metered gas. It acted as a buffer, removing the need for continuous gas production. The weight of the gas holder lift (cap) controlled the pressure of the gas in the mains and provided back pressure for the gas-making plant.

They are the only storage method that keeps gas at district pressure (the pressure required in local gas mains).

Types
There are two basic types of gas holder: the water-sealed and the rigid waterless.

The water-sealed gas holder consists of a tank of water that rises and falls to take the gas. A watered gas holder consisted of two parts: a deep tank of water used to provide a seal, and a closed vessel (the lift) that rises above the water as the gas volume increased.

Rigid waterless gas holders were a very early design that neither expanded or contracted. There are modern versions of the waterless gas holder, e.g. oil-sealed, grease-sealed and "dry seal" (membrane) types. They consist of a fixed cylinder capped by a moving piston.

Water-sealed gas holders 

The earliest Boulton and Watt gas holders had a single lift. The tank was above ground and was lined with wood; the lift was guided by tripods and cables. Pulleys and weights were supplied to regulate the gas pressure. The engineer John Malam devised a tank with a central rod-and-tube guide system.

Telescoping holders fall into two subcategories. The earlier of the telescoping variety were column-guided variations and were built from 1824. To guide the telescoping walls, or "lifts", they have an external fixed frame, visible at a fixed height at all times. A refinement was the guide frame gas holder, where the heavy columns were replaced by a lighter and more extensive framework. Vertical girders (standards) were intersected by horizontal girders and cross-braced. This could be bolted onto an underground or above-ground tank. The Cutler patented guide frame dispensed with the horizontal girders using diagonal triangulated framing instead. Cable-guided gas holders, invented by Pease in 1880, had a limited use, but were useful on unstable ground where the rigid systems could buckle and jam the lift.

Spiral-guided gas holders were built in the UK from 1890 until 1983. These have no frame, and each lift is guided by the one below, rotating as it goes up as dictated by helical runners.

Both telescoping types use the manometric property of water to provide a seal. The whole tank floats in a circular or annular water reservoir, held up by the roughly constant pressure of a varying volume of gas, the pressure determined by the weight of the structure, and the water providing the seal for the gas within the moving walls. Besides storing the gas, the tank's design serves to establish the pressure of the gas system. With telescoping (multiple-lift) tanks, the innermost tank has an approximately  lip around the outside of the bottom edge, called a cup, which picks up water as it rises above the reservoir water level. This immediately engages a downward lip on the inner rim of the next outer lift, called a dip or grip, and as this grip sinks into the cup, it preserves the water seal as the inner tank continues to rise until the grip grounds on the cup, whereupon further injection of gas will start to raise that lift as well. Holders were built with as many as four lifts. An extra flying lift could be retrofitted into column or frame gas holders. This was an additional inner tank that extended above the standards, when the infrastructure would support the extra shear forces and weight. Though not exclusively, spiral guides were used.

Dry-seal-type gas holder 

Dry-seal gas holders have a static cylindrical shell, within which a piston rises and falls. As it moves, a grease seal, tar/oil seal or a sealing membrane which is rolled out and in from the piston keeps the gas from escaping. The MAN (Maschinenfabrik Augsburg-Nürnberg AG) was introduced in 1915: it was polygonal and used a tar/oil seal. The Klonne dry seal gas holder was circular: it used a grease seal. The dry-seal Wiggins gasholder was patented in 1952: it used a flexible curtain that was suspended from the piston. The largest low-pressure gas Holder built was the Klonne gas holder built in 1938 in Gelsenkirchen.

By location

Europe 

The pollution associated with gasworks and gas storage makes the land difficult to reclaim for other purposes, but some gas holders, such as the Vienna Gasometers, have been converted into other uses such as living space and a shopping mall and historical archives for the city. Many sites, however, were never used for the production of 'town gas', therefore the land contamination is relatively low.

Gas holders have been a major part of the skylines of low-rise British cities for up to 200 years, due to their large distinctive shape and central location. They were originally used for balancing daily demand and generation of town gas. With the move to natural gas and construction of the national grid pipework, their use steadily diminished as the pipe network could both store gas under pressure, and eventually satisfy peak demand directly. London, Manchester, Sheffield, Birmingham, Leeds, Newcastle, Salisbury and Glasgow (which has the largest gasometers in the UK) are noted for having many gas holders.

Some of these gas holders have become listed buildings. The gas holders behind King's Cross station in London were specially dismantled when the new Channel Tunnel Rail Link was being created, with Gas holder No 8 being re-erected on a nearby site behind St Pancras station as part of a housing development. It has been fashioned into a park. Most gas holders are no longer used, and a program of dismantling is underway to release the land for reuse. 

One of the largest remaining groups of gasholders is at Bromley-by-Bow in East London, believed to be the largest in Europe.

A gasworks in South Lotts, Dublin, Ireland, was converted into apartments.

In the past, holder stations would have an operator living on site controlling their movement. However, with the process control systems now used on these sites, such an operator is obsolete.

In the UK as well as other European countries, a movement to preserve classic gasometers has emerged in recent years, especially after Britain's National Grid announced in 2013 their plans to remove 76 gas holders, and soon afterwards, Southern and Scottish Gas networks announced that they would demolish 111 others. Christopher Costelloe, director of the Victorian Society, a leader in the campaign to preserve gasometers, has said that "Gasometers, by their very size and structure, cannot help but become landmarks. [They] are singularly dramatic structures for all their emptiness."

The gasholder in Amsterdam has hosted the Awakenings Techno parties.

United States 

Gasometers are comparatively rare in the US. Several were erected in St. Louis by the Laclede Gas Light Company in the early 20th century. These gasometers remained in use until the early first decade of the 21st century, when the last one was decommissioned and abandoned in place. The most recently used gasometer in the United States was on the southeast side of Indianapolis, but it has been demolished along with the adjoining Citizens Energy Group coke plant. Another pair of holders at the Newtown Holder Station, in Elmhurst, Queens, in New York City, was a popular landmark for traffic reporters until they were demolished in 1996 and became Elmhurst Park. The demolition of two larger "Maspeth Tanks" in nearby Greenpoint, Brooklyn, was described by The New York Times at length.

A large MAN-type gas holder was erected just east of Baltimore, Maryland, by Koppers Inc. in 1949 and operated by Baltimore Gas and Electric for 32 years. The ,  structure, which could hold , was a landmark due to its unusual marking scheme, which had a red-and-white checkerboard pattern from  up. The structure was demolished in July 1984.

Approximately a dozen brick or concrete structures built in the latter half of the 19th-century to house gasholders, known as gasholder houses, still exist in the United States. The Troy Gas Light Company structure in Troy, New York, is one of the largest remaining examples. As of early 2021, efforts were under way to save the Concord Gas Light Company Gasholder House in Concord, New Hampshire. It is unusual because the inner workings of the structure, including the cap, are still in place.

PG&E operated gas holders at its gasification plants in California before natural gas pipelines were built. The San Francisco Beach Street Plant was built in 1899. The gas plant operated until 1931, but its associated gas holder was used with natural gas into the 1950s, when the property was redeveloped. Gas holders also previously existed at Chico (demolished 1951), Daly City, Eureka, Fresno, Los Angeles, including two within sight of City Hall Merced, Monterey, Oakland, Redding (gas holder demolished early 1960s), Redwood City (gas holder built early 1900s, demolished 1959), Salinas, San Francisco Potrero Plant, Santa Rosa, St. Helena, Stockton, Vallejo, Willows; and likely existed at their other gasification plants in Colusa, Hollister, Lodi, Madera, Marysville, Modesto, Napa, Oakdale, Oroville, Red Bluff, Sacramento, San Luis Obispo, Santa Cruz, Selma, Tracy, Turlock, Watsonville and Woodland.

Australia 

Gasholders, though once common, have become rare in Australia. Most gasworks within the country were demolished or repurposed, and few gasometers remain because of this. A good example of a largely intact gasometer is located at the Launceston Gasworks site in Tasmania. Though the gas bell has been removed, all other components are intact. The remains of two older 1860s gasometers are also visible on site but only the foundations remain. In Sydney a beautiful ornate gasometer frame can be seen from the platform of the Macdonaldtown railway station which was built above the access tunnels of the adjoining gasworks site.

In Queensland, the Gasworks Newstead is a commercial, residential, and retail development adjoining the river at Newstead, Brisbane, opening in 2013, built around a now heritage-listed 1887 gas holder. Only the frame remains, inside of which is a plaza used as a public recreation zone and for occasional special events such as markets or concerts. At dusk each day a dynamic lighting display illuminates the frame. The former industrial site on the inner-city fringe became an urban renewal zone for upmarket housing centred on the Gasworks zone.

For many years, a huge gasholder towered over the Arden Street Oval, the home ground of the North Melbourne Football Club in the Victorian Football League. Television coverage of Australian Rules football matches played at the famous ground showed the gasholder dominating the landscape. It was demolished in late 1977/early 1978.

Argentina 

This gasholder once operated by Gas del Estado is located in Villa Maipú, Partido de San Martín, Argentina. It was built in 1948 by MAN, and it was used to store coke gas produced by a near factory named Usina Corrales. The structure remains in place and it is property of Gas Natural Fenosa.

Other storage systems 
Gas more recently was stored in large underground reservoirs such as salt caverns. In modern times, however, line-packing is the preferred method.

Throughout the 1960s and 1970s it was thought that gas holders could be replaced with high-pressure bullets (a cylindrical pressure vessel with hemispherical ends). However, regulations brought in meant that all new bullets must be built several miles out of towns and cities, and the security of storing large amounts of high-pressure natural gas above ground made them unpopular with local people and councils. Bullets are gradually being decommissioned. It is also possible to store natural gas in liquid form, and this is widely practised throughout the world.

See also 
 Gasometer Oberhausen
 Gashouse District
 Natural gas storage
 Water tower, similar utility storage structures
 Gasværket – a theatre in Copenhagen which was formerly a huge gas holder

References 
 Notes

 Bibliography

Further reading

External links 

 Use of gasometers in Oil & Gas industry
 Condemned: The great gasometer from BBC News, January 28, 1999
 Gasometer Augsburg in Germany and a list of many Gasometers in Europe
 Gasometer Schlieren, Switzerland
 "The rise and fall of gasometers" Extrageographic magazine
 Gasholders and their tanks
 Early London Gas Industry
 Visits_to_Works 1894_Institution_of_Mechanical_Engineers: including Manchester and Salford Gas Works

 
Gas technologies
Petroleum production